Zlatnite Mostove (‘Golden Bridges’) is the largest stone river on Vitosha Mountain, Bulgaria. The feature is situated in the valley of Vladayska River, extending 2.2 km, and up to 150 m wide, with several ‘tributary’ stone rivers. The stone river is ‘descending’ from elevation 1800 m above sea level in Boeritsa Chalet area to 1410 m at Zlatnite Mostove site. The lower extremity of the stone river is known as Zlatnite Mostove site, a popular tourist destination accessible from Sofia by road.

The name ‘Golden Bridges’ derives from the golden colour of the lichens growing on the surface of stone run boulders.

External links
 Large Collection of Images from Zlatnite Mostove

Sources

Rock formations of Bulgaria
Vitosha
Landforms of Sofia City Province